The Kuwait Space Rocket (KSR), is a Kuwaiti project to build and launch the first suborbital liquid bi-propellant rocket in Arabia. The project is intended to be the first step towards starting a space industry in the country and a launch service provider in the GCC region. The project is divided into two phases with two separate vehicles.

History 
The project began in January 2018 for conceptual design and planning. The team started the fabrication of KSR-1 in early 2019, and as of January 2020, KSR-1 was fully built.

KSR-1 
KSR-1 is a vertically-launched single stage rocket. It uses a liquid bi-propellant rocket engine burning methanol as fuel and nitrous oxide as the oxidizer. KSR-1 is intended to be a test vehicle for the development of KSR-2, the goal of which is to reach space. As such, all the major components and technologies that are expected to be used in KSR-2 are present in KSR-1. The main components of KSR 1 are the engine—consisting of the injector, nozzle, and cooling jacket— with fuel and oxidizer tanks, a nitrogen gas tank, and various valves and pressure regulators.

KSR-1 Development Process

Engine Fabrication 

The KSR-1 engine was built locally in Kuwait and it utilizes a pressure fed cycle. The engine utilizes the nitrous not only as an oxidizer but as a cooling agent, that flows around the nozzle and back into the injector again.

Cold Flow Testing 
The KSR team performed a cold flow testing in October 2019 to verify the engine's flow rate and plumbing.

Static Testing 

KSR performed a static testing of the Injector in November 2019.

Structural Assembly 
The KSR-1 was fully assembled and presented at the Kuwait Aviation Show 2020.

KSR-2 
KSR-2 is a planned liquid bi-propellant suborbital launch vehicle. It is the second installment of the KSR Rocket Family, composed of a single stage, fueled by nitrous oxide and methanol. KSR-2 will have a total length of 4 m, a diameter of 0.4 m and a total mass of 591 kg, its apogee will be around 100 km.

See also
 Sub-orbital spaceflight
 Launch vehicle

References 



Suborbital spaceflight
Aerospace
Research groups